Miss Canada is a beauty pageant for young women in Canada.

Miss Canada may also refer to:

Miss Dominion of Canada (1959–1979), selected Canada's representatives to various international contests
Miss Universe Canada (2003– ), selects winners for the Miss Universe pageant
Miss World Canada, selects winners for the Miss World competition
Miss Earth Canada (2001– ), selects winners for the Miss Earth competition
Miss Teen Canada (1969–1990)
Miss Canada International (1995– )
Miss Canada Icon, a national personification of Canada

See also
Mr. Canada (disambiguation)